The shining honeycreeper (Cyanerpes lucidus) is a small bird in the tanager family. It is found in the tropical New World in Central America from southern Mexico to Panama and northwest Colombia. It is sometimes considered to be conspecific with the purple honeycreeper (C. caeruleus), but the two species breed sympatrically in eastern Panama and northwest Colombia.

This is a forest canopy species, but also occurs in forest edges and secondary growth.  The female builds a shallow cup nest in a tree, and incubates the clutch of two eggs.

The shining honeycreeper is 10 cm long, weighs 11 g and has a long black decurved bill. The male is purple-blue with black wings, tail and throat, and bright yellow legs. The female has green upperparts, a greenish-blue head, buff throat and buff-streaked bluish underparts. The immature is similar to the female, but is greener on the head and breast.

The call of this honeycreeper is a thin high-pitched seee, and the male's song is a pit pit pit pit pit-pit repeated for minutes at a time.

This species is very similar to the purple honeycreeper, but the male of the latter species is overall slightly darker and its black throat patch is smaller. Unlike the female shining honeycreeper, the female purple honeycreeper has buff (not dusky) lores and, except for its malar, no clear blue tinge to the head.

The shining honeycreeper is easily distinguished from the larger red-legged honeycreeper with which its shares its range by the latter species’ red legs and, in the male, black mantle.

The shining honeycreeper is usually found in pairs or family groups. It feeds on nectar, berries and insects, mainly in the canopy. It responds readily to the call of the ferruginous pygmy owl.

References

Further reading

External links
Shining honeycreeper photo gallery VIREO

shining honeycreeper
Birds of Central America
Birds of Mexico
Birds of Guatemala
Birds of Honduras
Birds of Nicaragua
Birds of Costa Rica
Birds of Panama
shining honeycreeper
shining honeycreeper
shining honeycreeper